United Nations Security Council Resolution 2042 was unanimously adopted on 14 April 2012.

Content 
The resolution, which authorizes the dispatch of an advance team of up to 30 unarmed military observers to Syria to monitor compliance with the ceasefire agreement, passed 15-0.

The observers will be tasked with establishing and maintaining contact with both sides of the conflict, and making reports on compliance with the ceasefire agreement until a full mission is deployed in the country.

See also 
 List of United Nations Security Council Resolutions 2001 to 2100
 United Nations Security Council Resolution 2043 of 21 April 2012
 List of United Nations resolutions concerning Syria

References

External links
Text of the Resolution at undocs.org

2012 United Nations Security Council resolutions
 2042
2012 in Syria
International reactions to the Syrian civil war
April 2012 events